Galleani is a surname. Notable people with the surname include:

 Ely Galleani (born 1953), Italian film actress
 Luigi Galleani (1861–1931), Italian anarchist active in the United States

See also
 Galleanists
 Gallerani

Italian-language surnames